Andrew "Andy" Fiscella (born May 25, 1966) is an American actor who appeared in the films Quarantine and The Final Destination. He also appeared in Ice Cube's music video "Why We Thugs".

Filmography

Television

Music video 
2006 - Why We Thugs by Ice Cube - Himself

References

External links

American male film actors
American male television actors
Living people
1966 births